A.B. Lucas Secondary School is a secondary school located at the northern end of London, Ontario, Canada.

The school was named after A.B. Lucas, who was recognized for his contribution to education in London. In April 1962, Hugh Murray became the first principal. He commissioned lieutenants Terry Ferris, Jim Wylie, Don Epplet, Phil Sparling, Don Carson, Charlie Belchamber, Alex Shamas, Alan Williams, Ed Hancox and Fred Hickman. During the next few months, these men recruited more staff, acquired equipment and supplies and arranged programs.

During the years 1962–1963 some 60 north-Londoners traveled daily to Westminster Secondary School in the west end of the city. But by September 1963 the doors were opened to the first Viking recruits in grades 9, 10, and 11. The premier of Ontario, Mr. John Robarts, officially opened the school on October 25, 1963.

History and construction
By early 1960, monumental growth in north London soon established the need for the construction of a new secondary school to accommodate the new families moving into the area. Suffering economic restraint, the Board of Education was hesitant to approve growth, but eventually approved the project in an effort to reduce the strain on other schools in the city.

Robert D. Schoales, a noted regional modernist, was responsible for the design of the existing structure that would be built concurrently with Westminster Secondary School in Byron. As architect for the London Board of Education, Schoales was responsible for the design of many of London's mid-century school buildings, including  Knollwood Park Public School (70 Gammage Street), G. A. Wheable Centre for Adult Education London (70 Jacqueline Street), and many others. His design incorporated an L-shaped two-story brick structure, including a stilted instrumental music wing, and auditorium. Terrazzo flooring was chosen for its durability, while glazed tile was utilised as an attractive, yet cost effective decoration for the entrance foyers. In addition to consultation work with educational boards throughout Ontario, Schoales collaborated with the Ministry of the Solicitor General, providing advice in the design and construction of correctional facilities across the province.

During the construction process, the future students of Lucas (including a large number of future Westminster students) attended Wheable Secondary School while they waited for their new school to be completed. Following the organization of the schools' administrative teams, the staff and students of Wheable attended classes in the morning while the Lucas and Westminster staff and students attended afternoon shifts, ending at 5:45 pm each day. These original students recall 'not starting classes until noon hour and then boarding the buses in the dark and arriving at their country homes in the pitch black of a winter's night.'

A.B Lucas was officially opened in October 1963, seven months following the completion of Westminster. While the building was considered impressive by both students and journalists, many of the buildings features had yet to be completed, and it would be several months before the school would become fully operational. The irritation from concrete and plaster dust constantly lingering in the air forced many students wearing contact lenses to wear only one at a time in an effort to allow the other eye to heal. Rodents meanwhile infested the lockers, using the drain holes in each locker to scavenge food from unsuspecting students' lunch boxes.

Sports and clubs

Clubs :

A.B. Lucas ranks high in competitive clubs and activities such as DECA, Mock Trial, Model United Nations, Reach for the Top, Science Fair, and Science Olympics.

In the past, A.B. Lucas students have been qualified to compete in DECA Provincials and Internationals, won the 2017 London, Middlesex, Oxford & Elgin Ontario Mock Trial Tournament by OBA/OJEN Competitive Mock Trials (OOCMT), and competed in CWSF (Canada-Wide Science Fair) with multiple awards.

With these club experiences, A.B. Lucas students broaden their experiences through the school board of 76,000 students as well.
A.B. Lucas students represented TVDSB as Student Trustees in 2016–17 and 2017–18. 
In the past, A.B. Lucas students also represented the school board at the provincial level at OSTA-AECO.

 Athletic Council
 AV Light/Sound
 Cancer Campaign
 Chess
 Computer
 Concert Choir
 Creative Writing
 DECA
 Drama
 FIRST Robotics Team 6854
 Gallery
 Green Team
 Math Contests
 Intermediate and Senior Band
 Intramural Council
 Math Tutoring
 Mock Trial
 Model United Nations
 Multicultural
 Music Council
 Newspaper
 Photography
 Reach for the Top
 Relay for Life Committee
 Social Justice
 Student Athletic Association
 Science Fair
 Science Olympics
 School Show (Drama)
 SCROOGE Committee
 Small Ensemble
 United Way
 Viking Volunteers
 Viking 101
 Yearbook

Sports:

A.B. Lucas students continue to qualify for WOSSAA (Western Ontario Secondary School Athletic Association) and OFSAA (Ontario Federation of School Athletic Association) every year in a variety of sports.

Male:

 Baseball
 Badminton
 Basketball
 Cross Country
 Curling
 Football
 Golf
 Hockey
 Rugby
 Swimming
 Track and Field
 Volleyball
 Wrestling

Female :

 Badminton
 Basketball
 Curling
 Cross Country
 Golf
 Hockey
 Rowing
 Soccer
 Swimming
 Track and Field
 Volleyball
 Wrestling

Academics and rankings

A.B. Lucas Secondary School ranked 186th out of all 738 secondary schools in Ontario in the 2017–18 Fraser Institute Ontario secondary school ranking with an overall rating of 7.2 out of 10. The school has consistently performed well, ranking 148th out of 625 in the most recent 5 years

Events

Relay for Life

On June 1, 2018, A.B. Lucas Secondary School ranked #1 in Canada by the students raising $201,000 to support cancer research with the Canadian Cancer Society for the annual overnight event, Relay for Life.

Lucas had previously also been ranked #1 in Canada in 2017 by raising $190,000.

Since 2005, A.B. Lucas Secondary School has raised a total of $1,001,000 for the nationwide event and is the first school in Canada to achieve that goal.

Notable alumni

 Craig Billington, Former NHL goalie
 Trevor Blumas, actor
 Logan Couture, NHL player plays for the San Jose Sharks
 Jeff Hackett, Former NHL goalie
 Nazem Kadri, NHL Player plays for the Calgary Flames.
 David Lee, CFL player for Saskatchewan Roughriders
 Deb Matthews, M.P.P. for London North Centre
 Gloria Reuben, actress
 Jamie Romak, Baseball Player for SSG Landers
 David Shore, creator of House MD

See also
 List of high schools in Ontario

References

External links

 
 Viking Robotics Website

High schools in London, Ontario
Educational institutions established in 1963
1963 establishments in Ontario